Pfaffenteich is a pond in Schwerin, Mecklenburg-Vorpommern, Germany.

Lakes of Mecklenburg-Western Pomerania
Ponds of Mecklenburg-Western Pomerania